Klučenice is a municipality and village in Příbram District in the Central Bohemian Region of the Czech Republic. It has about 400 inhabitants.

Administrative parts
Villages of Kamenice, Kosobudy, Koubalova Lhota, Planá, Voltýřov and Zadní Chlum are administrative parts of Klučenice.

References

Villages in Příbram District